Colin Neblett (July 6, 1875 – May 7, 1950) was a United States district judge of the United States District Court for the District of New Mexico.

Education and career

Born in Brunswick County, Virginia, Neblett received a Bachelor of Laws from Washington and Lee University School of Law in 1897. He entered private practice in Silver City, New Mexico Territory (State of New Mexico from January 6, 1912) in 1898. He was a member of the New Mexico Territorial Legislature in 1905. He was a superintendent of schools for Grant County, New Mexico Territory from 1907 to 1911, and was a Judge of the Sixth Judicial District of New Mexico from 1912 to 1916.

Federal judicial service

On January 29, 1917, Neblett was nominated by President Woodrow Wilson to a seat on the United States District Court for the District of New Mexico vacated by Judge William Hayes Pope. Neblett was confirmed by the United States Senate on February 5, 1917, and received his commission the same day. He assumed senior status on July 6, 1948, serving in that capacity until his death on May 7, 1950.

References

Sources
 

1875 births
1950 deaths
Judges of the United States District Court for the District of New Mexico
United States district court judges appointed by Woodrow Wilson
20th-century American judges
People from Brunswick County, Virginia
Washington and Lee University School of Law alumni
People from Silver City, New Mexico